A center of origin is a geographical area where a group of organisms, either domesticated or wild, first developed its distinctive properties. They are also considered centers of diversity. Centers of origin were first identified in 1924 by Nikolai Vavilov.

Plants
Locating the origin of crop plants is basic to plant breeding.  This allows one to locate wild relatives, related species, and new genes (especially dominant genes, which may provide resistance to diseases).
Knowledge of the origins of crop plants is important in order to avoid genetic erosion, the loss of germplasm due to the loss of ecotypes and landraces, loss of habitat (such as rainforests), and increased urbanization. Germplasm preservation is accomplished through gene banks (largely seed collections but now frozen stem sections) and preservation of natural habitats (especially in centers of origin).

Vavilov centers

A Vavilov Center (of Diversity) is a region of the world. First indicated by Nikolai Vavilov to be an original center for the domestication of plants. For crop plants, Nikolai Vavilov identified differing numbers of centers: three in 1924, five in 1926, six in 1929, seven in 1931, eight in 1935 and reduced to seven again in 1940. 

Vavilov argued that plants were not domesticated somewhere in the world at random, but that there were regions where domestication started. The center of origin is also considered the center of diversity.

Vavilov's scheme as updated by Schery and Janick
Vavilov centers are regions where a high diversity of crop wild relatives can be found, representing the natural relatives of domesticated crop plants.

Cultivated plants of  eight world centers of origin

Purugganan and Fuller 2009 scheme

See also
Crop wild relative
Crop diversity
Landrace
Neglected and underutilized crop

References

Conservation biology
History of agriculture
Neolithic